During the First Indochina War (1946 –1954), Vietnam War (1955–1975), Cambodian–Vietnamese War (1977–1989), Sino-Vietnamese War (1979) and the Sino-Vietnamese conflicts 1979– 1991 (1979–1991), the Vietnam People's Ground Force relied almost entirely on Soviet-derived weapons and equipment systems. With the end of the Cold War in 1992 Soviet military equipment subsidies ended and Vietnam began the use of hard currency and barter to buy weapons and equipment.

Vietnam prioritises economic development and growth while maintaining defense spending. The government does not conduct procurement phases or major upgrades of weapons. From the end of the 1990s the Government of Vietnam has announced the acquisition of a number of strategic systems equipped with modern weapons. Accordingly, Vietnam has been slow to develop naval and air forces to control shallow waters and its exclusive economic zone (EEZ). Currently most defence procurement programs focus on remedying this priority. For example, Vietnam has purchased a number of combat aircraft and warships with the capability to operate in high seas. Vietnam also plans to develop its defence industry, with priority placed on the Navy, combined with assistance from its former communist allies, India, and Japan.

Since 2015, Vietnam has begun exploring purchases of U.S. and European weapons while facing numerous political, historical, and financial barriers, as they cannot continue to rely on Soviet and Chinese weapons especially due to the increasing tensions in the South China Sea dispute.

Uniform equipment

Infantry weapons

Vehicles

UAV

Procurement
In 2006, Israel reported to the United Nations Register Organisation of Conventional Arms (UNROCA) that two of its light armoured vehicles had been sold to Vietnam. A number of Israeli companies won a bid to modernise and upgrade T-54/55 tanks as well as establishing factories in the country. Israel's program includes upgrading armour, night vision system and a fire control system upgrade (produced in Poland). In May 2002, Vietnam and Ukraine reached an agreement of military technical co-operation which extended to 2005. Accordingly, Ukraine will support Vietnam primarily to upgrade its armour and artillery, and improve weapons co-production and repair facilities. In February 2005, the Ministry of Defence of Finland ceded to Vietnam about 70 T-54 and T-55 tanks from the Soviet era. In early March 2005, Poland signed a contract to sell to Vietnam 150 T-72 tanks which would have been used to support training, ammunition, equipment maintenance, and repair, but this contract was cancelled in 2006 because Vietnam wanted to focus more on its Navy and Air Force. In addition to upgrading tanks, the Ministry of Defence of Vietnam signed a military co-operation agreement with Russia. The Vietnamese have also developed the capacity to produce their own equipment and repair existing equipment.

References

Military equipment of Vietnam
People's Army of Vietnam
Vietnam